James Joseph Johnson (25 September 1881 – 5 May 1956) was a New Zealand professional rugby league footballer who played in the 1910s. He played at representative level for New Zealand (Heritage № 102), and Hawke's Bay, as a forward (prior to the specialist positions of), during the era of contested scrums.

Playing career

Club career and Hawke's Bay side
In 1911 Johnson played for Ahuriri in the inaugural Hawke's Bay club competition. He played 2 matches for Hawke's Bay, one of which was against Auckland at Victoria Park. He scored a try in a 17-13 loss. He also played one match for Napier against Dannevirke. In 1912 he played for Napier against Danevirke and played in 4 matches for Hawke's Bay against Auckland, Hamilton, New South Wales, and Canterbury. He scored a try against Auckland and another against the New South Wales side, while adding a goal in their match with Canterbury.

International honours
Johnson represented New Zealand in 1913 against New South Wales.

References

New Zealand national rugby league team players
New Zealand rugby league players
Place of birth missing
Place of death missing
Rugby league forwards
Hawke's Bay rugby league team players
1881 births
1956 deaths